The Men's Greco-Roman 85 kilograms is a competition featured at the 2014 World Wrestling Championships, and was held in Tashkent, Uzbekistan on 12 September 2014.

Results
Legend
C — Won by 3 cautions given to the opponent
F — Won by fall

Finals

Top half

Section 1

Section 2

Bottom half

Section 3

Section 4

Repechage

References
Official website

Men's Greco-Roman 85 kg